Carlo Sciarrone  (born 17 November 1983) is an Italian footballer who plays as a goalkeeper.

Career
In July 2005, Sciarrone was signed by Udinese, serving as the club's third-choice goalkeeper behind Morgan De Sanctis and Gabriele Paoletti. In summer 2007, he left for Massese in a co-ownership deal. The following season, he was signed by Gallipoli. He played twice throughout the season for the eventual Prima Divisione champions, behind Generoso Rossi. In the next season, he shared the first choice goalkeeping spot with Jan Koprivec and was backed by Simone Palese who played in a 6–0 away defeat in the 2009–10 Coppa Italia.

Honours
Gallipoli
Lega Pro Prima Divisione: 2009

External links

Italian footballers
S.S. Chieti Calcio players
Udinese Calcio players
U.S. Massese 1919 players
A.S.D. Gallipoli Football 1909 players
Association football goalkeepers
Footballers from Genoa
1983 births
Living people